John Stark is a marble sculpture depicting John Stark by Carl Conrads, installed in the United States Capitol's crypt, in Washington, D.C., as part of the National Statuary Hall Collection. The statue was donated by the U.S. state of New Hampshire in 1894.

See also
 1894 in art

References

External links

 

1894 establishments in Washington, D.C.
1894 sculptures
Marble sculptures in Washington, D.C.
Monuments and memorials in Washington, D.C.
Stark, John
Sculptures of men in Washington, D.C.